Scotch Bar Time (born 1974) was a Quarter Horse stallion and sire.

Scotch Bar Time was a 1974 sorrel stallion, sired by Sonny Dee Bar, and out of Chubby Time, a daughter of  Spot Time. He sired 1186 foals in his breeding career, and his offspring have earned $136,394.00 in National Snaffle Bit Association (or NSBA) earnings. He was inducted into the NSBA Hall of Fame in 2002.

Scotch Bar Time was inducted into the American Quarter Horse Association's (or AQHA) AQHA Hall of Fame in 2009.

Pedigree

Notes

References

 
 
  Retrieved on May 17, 2009

American Quarter Horse sires
1974 animal births
AQHA Hall of Fame (horses)